Allen County Airport  is a county-owned public-use airport located three nautical miles (6 km) southeast of the central business district of Iola, in Allen County, Kansas, United States.

Facilities and aircraft 
It has one runway designated 1/19 with a concrete surface measuring is 5,500 by 100 feet (1,676 x 30 m).

For the 12-month period ending July 25, 2008, the airport had 16,502 aircraft operations, an average of 45 per day: 97% general aviation, 3% air taxi, <1% scheduled commercial and <1% military. At that time there were 11 aircraft based at this airport: 82% single-engine and 18% multi-engine.

References

External links 
 Allen County Airport at Iola.com
 Aerial photo from USGS The National Map, 28 August 1992
 
 

Airports in Kansas
Buildings and structures in Allen County, Kansas
Kansas
Airports